Christmas Songs is the eighth full-length studio album and first Christmas album from Jars of Clay, that was released on October 16, 2007, through Gray Matters/Nettwerk. This is the first ever release from the band through their newly created Gray Matters imprint via Nettwerk Music Group.

Background
In 2006, Jars of Clay began to seek a new recording contract as their then-current contract with Sony BMG's Christian sub-label Essential Records was due to end a few releases later. The group then decided to create their own label named Gray Matters and formed a partnership with the label and imprint label Nettwerk. The group decided to record their first full length Christmas album to debut on this label. The group previously has released one Christmas EP named Drummer Boy, which contained the classic Christmas carol "The Little Drummer Boy". The group also contributed their original Christmas song "Bethlehem Town" to the Christmas edition of the City on a Hill series. In 2004, Jars appeared on the collection entitled Maybe This Christmas Tree with their lighter "Christmas for Cowboys" alongside artists such as Lisa Loeb, Ivy and Copeland. More recently, in 2005, Jars returned to the Christmas classics to cover "It Came Upon a Midnight Clear" on the collection Come Let Us Adore Him: A Christmas Worship Experience.

In 2007 as the contract with Sony BMG ended, the group began recording Christmas Songs, selecting a range of established and well known Christmas Carols, some lesser known songs and some original songs to present for this project. The album was recorded in one-take recording sessions, a recording method only used once before by the band, in their prior studio album Good Monsters. This recording method meant that the majority of the time spent on the album was spent in pre-production, arranging the songs, practicing the songs before entering the studio to record them.

Track listing

USB Stick Version
Christmas Songs was also released via USB stick format. The flash drive is reusable and has a capacity of 512 MB. The USB sticks were initially only available for purchase at concerts, but has since been added to the band's official online store. Each USB stick contains the following:

 Christmas Songs album in its entirety (MP3 files at 192 kbit/s bitrate)
 Acoustic version of "O Little Town of Bethlehem"
 Full-length music video for "Love Came Down at Christmas" (M4V video format)
 Readings of "First Breath", "Life As Advent", "The Burden of Hope" and "Who Gets to be Santa" from the book Peace Is Here, written by members of Jars of Clay
 Live video performances of "Hibernation Day" and "Drummer Boy" from the Gospel Music Channel's Christmas at Union Station special

Awards
In 2008, the album was nominated for a Dove Award for Christmas Album of the Year at the 39th GMA Dove Awards.

Credits 
Jars of Clay
 Dan Haseltine – vocals
 Charlie Lowell – keyboards, pianos, backing vocals
 Stephen Mason – guitars, backing vocals
 Matt Odmark – guitars, backing vocals

Additional musicians

 Gabe Ruschival – keyboards, bass, percussion, vibraphone, bells, backing vocals
 Jeremy Lutito – drums, percussion, bells, vibraphone, backing vocals
 Mitch Dane – tambourine
 Sam Levine – flute, woodwinds
 Jeff Bailey – trumpet
 Gil Long – tuba
 Jennifer Kummer – French horn
 John Catchings – cello
 Carole Rabinowitz – cello
 Jim Grosjean – viola
 Kristin Wilkinson – viola
 Conni Ellisor – violin
 Pamela Sixfin – violin
 Alan Umstead – violin
 Tom Howard – horn and string arrangements
 Carl Gorodetzky – orchestra leader
 Christine Denté – vocals

Production

 Jars of Clay – producer
 Mitch Dane – recording, engineer
 Vance Powell – recording, engineer, mixing
 Mike Odmark – recording assisting, assistant engineer
 Mike Paragone – recording assistant
 Joshua Vance Smith – recording assistant, assistant engineer, mix assistant
 Richard Dodd – mastering at RichardDodd.com, Nashville, Tennessee
 Christie Little – package illustrations and design
 Recorded, engineered and mixed at Sputnik Sound, Nashville, Tennessee
 Additional recording at East Iris Studios, Nashville, Tennessee

References

Jars of Clay albums
Gray Matters albums
Christmas albums by American artists
2007 Christmas albums
Alternative rock Christmas albums